Denis Detcheverry (born 29 April 1953) was a member of the Senate of France from 2004 to 2011, representing the islands of Saint Pierre and Miquelon.  He is a member of the Union for a Popular Movement.

References
Page on the Senate website

1953 births
Living people
Union for a Popular Movement politicians
French-Basque people
French Senators of the Fifth Republic
Saint Pierre and Miquelon politicians
Senators of Saint Pierre and Miquelon